The 2017–18 Mississippi State Bulldogs basketball team represented Mississippi State University in the 2017–18 NCAA Division I men's basketball season. The Bulldogs, led by third-year head coach Ben Howland, played their home games at the Humphrey Coliseum in Starkville, Mississippi as members of the Southeastern Conference. They finished the season 25–12, 9–9 in SEC play to finish in a tie for seventh place. They defeated LSU in the second round of the SEC tournament before losing in the quarterfinals to Tennessee. They were received an at-large bid to the National Invitation Tournament where they defeated Nebraska, Baylor, and Louisville to advance to the semifinals where they lost to Penn State.

Previous season
The Bulldogs finished the 2016–17 season 16–16, 6–12 in SEC play to finish in 12th place. They defeated LSU in the SEC tournament before losing in the second round to Alabama.

Offseason

Departures

Incoming transfers

2017 recruiting class

2018 recruiting class

Roster

Schedule and results

|-
!colspan=6 style=|Exhibition

|-

|-
!colspan=12 style=|Non-conference regular season

|-
!colspan=6 style=| SEC regular season

|-
!colspan=12 style=| SEC tournament

|-
!colspan=12 style=| NIT

References

Mississippi State Bulldogs men's basketball seasons
Mississippi State
Mississippi State Bulldogs men's
Mississippi State Bulldogs men's
Mississippi State